Arthur Farquhar Murray (23 July 1880 – 27 July 1930) was a Scottish amateur footballer who played as a centre half in the Scottish League for Queen's Park. He was a member of the club's committee and served as club president between 1921 and 1923.

Personal life 
Murray's younger brother Herbert was also a footballer. He studied Classics at Aberdeen University and later taught at Allan Glen's School in Glasgow. In June 1916, in the middle of the First World War, Murray enlisted as a private in the Argyll and Sutherland Highlanders. He was commissioned into the Gordon Highlanders as a lieutenant in January 1917 and was captured by the Germans during the German spring offensive in March 1918. Murray was released at the end of the war and was discharged from the army in January 1919. He took up the post of rector of Banff Academy in 1924.

Honours 
Forfar Athletic

 Forfarshire Cup: 1905–06

Arbroath

 Scottish Qualifying Cup: 1902–03

References

1880 births
Scottish footballers
Scottish Football League players
British Army personnel of World War I
Association football wing halves
Queen's Park F.C. players
1930 deaths
Argyll and Sutherland Highlanders soldiers
Gordon Highlanders officers
Footballers from Aberdeen
Queen's Park F.C. non-playing staff
World War I prisoners of war held by Germany
Victoria United F.C. players
Arbroath F.C. players
Forfar Athletic F.C. players
Scottish educators
Alumni of the University of Aberdeen
British World War I prisoners of war